Kofa is a 2022 Nigerian thriller film directed by Jude Idada.

Plot 
The film starts with eight people waking up in a closed room. They only recall their names. They try to recall who they are and why they are there as an armed guy begins to pick them out one by one. They try to overpower the man and plot an escape plan.

Cast 

 Ijeoma Grace Agu as Nnenna
 Lucy Ameh as Lilian
 Zainab Balogun as Hauwa
 Daniel Etim Effiong as Wale
 Kate Henshaw as Mishelia
 Beverly Naya as Franca

Awards 

 2022 - Best Film at the Africa International Film Festival (AFRIFF)
 2022 - Best Screenplay for Jude Idada at the Africa International Film Festival (AFRIFF)
 2022 - Best Actor award for Daniel Etim-Effiong at the Africa International Film Festival (AFRIFF)

References

External links 

 

2022 films
Nigerian thriller films